Pedro M. Silva (1900 – death date unknown) was a Cuban pitcher in the Negro leagues and Cuban League in the 1920s.

A native of Havana, Cuba, Silva played in the Negro leagues in 1921 and 1922 with the All Cubans and the Cuban Stars (West). He also played in the Cuban League with the Marianao club.

References

External links
 and Baseball-Reference Black Baseball stats and Seamheads

1900 births
Date of birth missing
Year of death missing
Place of death missing
All Cubans players
Cuban Stars (West) players
Marianao players
Baseball pitchers
Baseball players from Havana